Tinure is a small village and townland in the parish of Monasterboice, County Louth, Ireland. The official spelling of the village's name is Tinure (which is derived from Tigh an Iúir) however it is also sometimes referred to as "Tenure".

Tinure is predominantly rural in character, although there has been some new housing constructed in recent years. It falls within the scope of Drogheda Town, to its south, and Dunleer Town, to its north, which provide employment for many of the village's residents. There is a small business park located on the northern edge of the village, with a number of services firms on site. The village population increased from 296 inhabitants as of the 2002 census, to 464 as of the 2016 census.  The population is almost evenly distributed between male and female, male at 230 and female at 234. This growth can be largely attributed to its proximity to the M1 motorway, which has improved transport linkages to the locality.

Tinure is known for its Roman Catholic Church, The Church of Our Lady of the Immaculate Conception, which was constructed in 1894. It is located on the main junction of the five roads that intersect the village.

See also
 List of towns and villages in Ireland

References

Towns and villages in County Louth
Townlands of County Louth